My Real Life is a Canadian documentary film, directed by Magnus Isacsson and released in 2012. The last film Isacsson completed before his death, the film centres on the experiences of four young men in suburban Montréal-Nord who have turned to hip hop music as a creative outlet.

The film premiered at the 2012 Montreal International Documentary Festival, where it was the winner of the Grand Prize for Best National Feature. Due to Isacsson's death in August, it was screened as part of a tribute retrospective of several of his films at the Cinémathèque québécoise. The festival also announced the creation of the Magnus Isacsson Award, to honour Canadian films with a strong social message, in the same year.

The film was a Jutra Award nominee for Best Documentary Film at the 15th Jutra Awards in 2013.

The film was released on DVD in 2013.

References

External links

2012 films
2012 documentary films
Canadian documentary films
Documentary films about Montreal
Documentary films about hip hop music and musicians
Quebec films
2010s Canadian films